Al Hajj Sir Farimang Mamadi Singhateh, GCMG (10 November 1912 – 19 May 1977) was the second and last Governor-General of the Gambia, representing Queen Elizabeth II as head of state. Succeeding Sir John Warburton Paul, who had previously been the last Governor of The Gambia before independence, Sir Farimang was the only Gambian citizen to hold that post, beginning in 1966. His wife Fanta Singhateh was the first Gambian woman to be First Lady. When the country became a republic in 1970, the office was abolished, and the Prime Minister, Dauda (later Sir Dawda) Kairaba Jawara became an executive President.

Sir Farimang Singhateh was working as a dispenser/pharmacist in the Royal Victoria Hospital. He then moved on to have his own clinics in Soma and Farafeni. Before going into the private sector he spent time in Basse and Mansakonko serving those communities. He was appointed as the first black Governor-General by the Queen of the United Kingdom while he was working in his Clinic at Farafenni. Stories have been told that horses were his form of transportation in the early 1940s and 1950s as cars were not available at that time or era. He was an Ahmadi Muslim and Amir (President) of the Gambia’s Ahmadiyya community. After The Gambia became a republic Singhateh refrained from any politics until his untimely death in 1977. He went back to his medical practice which was his first love and spent time with his children traveling to Kolda and Dakar in neighboring Senegal to visiting friends and family. A street in the 
capital, Banjul, was named in his honour.

References

1912 births
1977 deaths
Gambian pharmacists
Governors-General of the Gambia
Gambian Ahmadis
Gambian knights
Knights Grand Cross of the Order of St Michael and St George